Bulbophyllum longissimum is a species of orchid in the genus Bulbophyllum. It is native to the Malay Peninsula. It is most noted for its very large flowers with pendant, pink lateral petals up to 30 cm (12 inches) in length. The lip is yellow.

References

Sources
The Bulbophyllum-Checklist
The Internet Orchid Species Photo Encyclopedia

External links
 

longissimum